The Stits DS-1 Baby Bird is a homebuilt aircraft built to achieve a "world's smallest" status. The Baby Bird is in the Guinness Book of World Records as the “Smallest Airplane in the World.” as of 1984. The title was later defined as "world's smallest monoplane" to acknowledge Robert H. Starr's Bumble Bee II as the world's smallest biplane.

Development
The DS-1 is a single-engine, single-seat highwing aircraft. Development started in 1980 to beat Ray Stits's record for World's smallest aircraft, the Stits SA-2A Sky Baby flown by Robert H. Starr. The fuselage is welded steel tubing with fabric covering. The wing is all-wood construction.

Operational history
Thirty-four flights took place in 1984 with United States Navy pilot Harold Nemer at the controls.

Specifications

See also

References

Homebuilt aircraft
High-wing aircraft
Single-engined tractor aircraft
Aircraft first flown in 1984
1980s United States experimental aircraft